Republican calendar may refer to:

 French Republican calendar
 Roman Republican calendar
 Republic of China calendar